Sir Thomas Clarges, 2nd Baronet (25 July 1688 – 19 February 1759), of Aston, near Stevenage, Hertfordshire, was an English politician who sat in the House of Commons from 1713 to 1715.

Clarges was the eldest surviving son of Sir Walter Clarges, 1st Baronet, whom he succeeded circa 31 March 1706 and was educated at St Paul's School.

Clarges was a Member of Parliament  for Lostwithiel from 1713 to 1715.

Clarges was appointed a Gentleman of the privy chamber by 1734 until his death. He married twice; firstly   Katherine, the daughter and coheiress of John Berkeley, 4th Viscount Fitzhardinge and secondly Frances, with whom he had a son Thomas, who predeased him. He was succeeded by his grandson Thomas.

References

 

1688 births
1759 deaths
People from Stevenage
People educated at St Paul's School, London
Baronets in the Baronetage of England
Members of the Parliament of Great Britain for constituencies in Cornwall
British MPs 1713–1715